Francesca Mills  (born 1996 or 1997) is a British actress, having played roles as Cherry Dorrington in television drama series Harlots (2019–2020), as Earthy Mangold in Worzel Gummidge (2021) and as Meldof in The Witcher: Blood Origin released by Netflix on 25 December 2022.

Early life
Mills was born with the genetic disorder Achondroplasia, a common form of dwarfism. 

As of 2021, Mills lives in London, but was brought up in Loggerheads, Staffordshire. Mills learned to dance at the Jill Clewes Dance School in Bradwell, Staffordshire, and first acted in a production of Oliver! at the age of nine. Mills was a student at Madeley High School in Madeley, Staffordshire. She also travelled to London to attend the Urdang Academy in Islington, and was a student at the Academy of Theatre Arts in Worcester.

Career
In 2014, Mills joined Warwick Davis's Reduced Height Theatre Company for its first production, a revival of  See How They Run, at the Richmond Theatre. In 2017, Mills was nominated for the Ian Charleson Awards for her performance as Maria in The Government Inspector at the Birmingham Repertory Theatre. The same year, Mills played a seamstress in the Timothy Sheader directed production of A Tale of Two Cities at the Regent's Park Open Air Theatre. In 2019, Mills played multiple roles in The American Clock at The Old Vic in 2019. The same year, Mills was in a national tour production of the Emma Rice version of the Malory Towers musical. From 2018 to 2019, Mills starred as Cherry Dorrington in series 2 and 3 of Harlots with co-stars Eloise Smyth and Samantha Morton, and as Earthy Mangold in Worzel Gummidge alongside Mackenzie Crook.

In August 2021, Mills began filming the Netflix miniseries The Witcher: Blood Origin, set in a time 1,200 years before The Witcher. Mills appears as Meldof, an assassin, in a cast which includes Lenny Henry and Michelle Yeoh. The miniseries aired on Netflix on 25 December 2022.

Filmography

Theatre

Film

Television

Awards and nominations

References

External links

Intertalent Group - Agent – Francesca Mills
Francesca Mills - twitter
Francesca Mills – Instagram
 

1990s births
Living people
21st-century English actresses
British television actresses
British film actresses
Actors with dwarfism